is a Japanese animation studio founded on May 19, 1975 and currently affiliated with TMS Entertainment. The company produces television series, films, and original video animations (OVA).

Works

Television series and original video animations

Films

Other

References

External links 
 Telecom Animation Film Official Website
 TMS Entertainment Official Website

 
Animation studios in Tokyo
Japanese animation studios
Japanese companies established in 1975
Mass media companies based in Tokyo
Mass media companies established in 1975